A Delicate Balance may refer to:

 A Delicate Balance (play), by Edward Albee 
 A Delicate Balance (film), an adaptation directed by Tony Richardson 
 "A Delicate Balance" (Touched by an Angel episode)